Fudbalski klub Mladi Radnik is a Serbian football club based in Požarevac.

History
FK Mladi Radnik was formed in 1926 and it was initially named SK Radnički.  The oldest stored image of the club dates from 1927.  In the spring of 1927, SK Radnički were officially included in the football league of Požarevac.  Its first match was recorded on the August 2, 1927, when they played against FK Pobeda.  Their first victory was recorded in September 1927, when they beat Hajduk by 2–1. Already under the name Mladi radnik the club joined the Football Association of Yugoslavia and started competing in 1928 in the Braničevo-podunavska regional League.

By the end of the 20th century the club was competing in the Second League of FR Yugoslavia.  In 2004 they were relegated to the Serbian League East.  After finishing among top places during the following three seasons, it will be in the season 2007–08 that they will finish top of the league, thus starting an impressive ascension that will make them climb two levels in two years culminating in the promotion to the Serbian SuperLiga.

In 2016, the club became defunct due to financial reasons and a club named FK Radnički 1926 was founded which played on the Vašarište Stadium as Mladi Radnik's successor. In 2017, the club was renamed to FK Mladi Radnik 1926 and now continues the Mladi Radnik tradition.

Notable former players
For the list of all current and former players with Wikipedia article, please see: :Category:FK Mladi Radnik players.

Coaching history
 Zoran Ranđelović (June 2010–2011)
 Nebojša Maksimović (June 2009–June 2010)
 Miloljub Ostojić ( –June 2009)
 Ivan Čančarević (2006)
 Branko Smiljanić (1996–1997)

External links

 Club profile and squad at Srbijafudbal

Football clubs in Serbia
Association football clubs established in 1926
1926 establishments in Serbia